Aa (also: Westfälische Aa, "Westphalian Aa") is a river of North Rhine-Westphalia, Germany. It is a left tributary of the Werre, which it joins in Herford. It is formed by the confluence of two small streams in Bielefeld-Milse. In its upper part, it is called Johannisbach.

See also
List of rivers of North Rhine-Westphalia

References

Rivers of North Rhine-Westphalia
Rivers of Germany